Cleopatra VII Philopator ("Cleopatra the father-beloved"; 70/69 BC10 August 30 BC) was Queen of the Ptolemaic Kingdom of Egypt from 51 to 30 BC, and its last active ruler. A member of the Ptolemaic dynasty, she was a descendant of its founder Ptolemy I Soter, a Macedonian Greek general and companion of Alexander the Great. After the death of Cleopatra, Egypt became a province of the Roman Empire, marking the end of the last Hellenistic state in the Mediterranean and of the age that had lasted since the reign of Alexander (336–323 BC). Although her first language was Koine Greek, she was the only Ptolemaic ruler to learn and use the Egyptian language.

In 58 BC, Cleopatra presumably accompanied her father, Ptolemy XII Auletes, during his exile to Rome after a revolt in Egypt (a Roman client state) allowed his rival daughter Berenice IV to claim his throne. Berenice was killed in 55 BC when Ptolemy returned to Egypt with Roman military assistance. When he died in 51 BC, the joint reign of Cleopatra and her brother Ptolemy XIII began, but a falling-out between them led to open civil war. After losing the 48 BC Battle of Pharsalus in Greece against his rival Julius Caesar (a Roman dictator and consul) in Caesar's Civil War, the Roman statesman Pompey fled to Egypt. Pompey had been a political ally of Ptolemy XII, but Ptolemy XIII, at the urging of his court eunuchs, had Pompey ambushed and killed before Caesar arrived and occupied Alexandria. Caesar then attempted to reconcile the rival Ptolemaic siblings, but Ptolemy's chief adviser, Potheinos, viewed Caesar's terms as favoring Cleopatra, so his forces besieged her and Caesar at the palace. Shortly after the siege was lifted by reinforcements, Ptolemy XIII died in the 47 BC Battle of the Nile; Cleopatra's half-sister Arsinoe IV was eventually exiled to Ephesus for her role in carrying out the siege. Caesar declared Cleopatra and her brother Ptolemy XIV joint rulers but maintained a private affair with Cleopatra that produced a son, Caesarion. Cleopatra traveled to Rome as a client queen in 46 and 44 BC, where she stayed at Caesar's villa. After the assassination of Caesar and (on her orders) Ptolemy XIV in 44 BC, she named Caesarion co-ruler as Ptolemy XV.

In the Liberators' civil war of 43–42 BC, Cleopatra sided with the Roman Second Triumvirate formed by Caesar's grandnephew and heir Octavian, Mark Antony, and Marcus Aemilius Lepidus. After their meeting at Tarsos in 41 BC, the queen had an affair with Antony. He carried out the execution of Arsinoe at her request, and became increasingly reliant on Cleopatra for both funding and military aid during his invasions of the Parthian Empire and the Kingdom of Armenia. The Donations of Alexandria declared their children Alexander Helios, Cleopatra Selene II, and Ptolemy Philadelphus rulers over various erstwhile territories under Antony's triumviral authority. This event, their marriage, and Antony's divorce of Octavian's sister Octavia Minor led to the final war of the Roman Republic. Octavian engaged in a war of propaganda, forced Antony's allies in the Roman Senate to flee Rome in 32 BC, and declared war on Cleopatra. After defeating Antony and Cleopatra's naval fleet at the 31 BC Battle of Actium, Octavian's forces invaded Egypt in 30 BC and defeated Antony, leading to Antony's suicide. When Cleopatra learned that Octavian planned to bring her to his Roman triumphal procession, she killed herself by poisoning, contrary to the popular belief that she was bitten by an asp.

Cleopatra's legacy survives in ancient and modern works of art. Roman historiography and Latin poetry produced a generally critical view of the queen that pervaded later Medieval and Renaissance literature. In the visual arts, her ancient depictions include Roman busts, paintings, and sculptures, cameo carvings and glass, Ptolemaic and Roman coinage, and reliefs. In Renaissance and Baroque art, she was the subject of many works including operas, paintings, poetry, sculptures, and theatrical dramas. She has become a pop culture icon of Egyptomania since the Victorian era, and in modern times, Cleopatra has appeared in the applied and fine arts, burlesque satire, Hollywood films, and brand images for commercial products.

Etymology

Cleopatra was the name of Alexander the Great's sister, as well as Cleopatra Alcyone, wife of Meleager in Greek mythology. Through the marriage of Ptolemy V Epiphanes and Cleopatra I Syra (a Seleucid princess), the name entered the Ptolemaic dynasty. Cleopatra's adopted title  means "goddess who loves her father".

Biography

Background

Ptolemaic pharaohs were crowned by the Egyptian high priest of Ptah at Memphis, but resided in the multicultural and largely Greek city of Alexandria, established by Alexander the Great of Macedon. They spoke Greek and governed Egypt as Hellenistic Greek monarchs, refusing to learn the native Egyptian language. In contrast, Cleopatra could speak multiple languages by adulthood and was the first Ptolemaic ruler to learn the Egyptian language. Plutarch implies that she also spoke Ethiopian, the language of the "Troglodytes", Hebrew (or Aramaic), Arabic, the Syrian language (perhaps Syriac), Median, and Parthian, and she could apparently also speak Latin, although her Roman contemporaries would have preferred to speak with her in her native Koine Greek. Aside from Greek, Egyptian, and Latin, these languages reflected Cleopatra's desire to restore North African and West Asian territories that once belonged to the Ptolemaic Kingdom.

Roman interventionism in Egypt predated the reign of Cleopatra. When Ptolemy IX Lathyros died in late 81 BC, he was succeeded by his daughter Berenice III. However, with opposition building at the royal court against the idea of a sole reigning female monarch, Berenice III accepted joint rule and marriage with her cousin and stepson Ptolemy XI Alexander II, an arrangement made by the Roman dictator Sulla. Ptolemy XI had his wife killed shortly after their marriage in 80 BC, but was lynched soon thereafter in the resulting riot over the assassination. Ptolemy XI, and perhaps his uncle Ptolemy IX or father Ptolemy X Alexander I, willed the Ptolemaic Kingdom to Rome as collateral for loans, so that the Romans had legal grounds to take over Egypt, their client state, after the assassination of Ptolemy XI. The Romans chose instead to divide the Ptolemaic realm among the illegitimate sons of Ptolemy IX, bestowing Cyprus on Ptolemy of Cyprus and Egypt on Ptolemy XII Auletes.

Early childhood

Cleopatra VII was born in early 69 BC to the ruling Ptolemaic pharaoh Ptolemy XII and an unknown mother, presumably Ptolemy XII's wife Cleopatra VI Tryphaena (also known as Cleopatra V Tryphaena), the mother of Cleopatra's older sister, Berenice IV Epiphaneia. Cleopatra Tryphaena disappears from official records a few months after the birth of Cleopatra in 69 BC. The three younger children of Ptolemy XII, Cleopatra's sister Arsinoe IV and brothers Ptolemy XIII Theos Philopator and Ptolemy XIV, were born in the absence of his wife. Cleopatra's childhood tutor was Philostratos, from whom she learned the Greek arts of oration and philosophy. During her youth Cleopatra presumably studied at the Musaeum, including the Library of Alexandria.

Reign and exile of Ptolemy XII

In 65 BC the Roman censor Marcus Licinius Crassus argued before the Roman Senate that Rome should annex Ptolemaic Egypt, but his proposed bill and the similar bill of tribune Servilius Rullus in 63 BC were rejected. Ptolemy XII responded to the threat of possible annexation by offering remuneration and lavish gifts to powerful Roman statesmen, such as Pompey during his campaign against Mithridates VI of Pontus, and eventually Julius Caesar after he became Roman consul in 59 BC. However, Ptolemy XII's profligate behavior bankrupted him, and he was forced to acquire loans from the Roman banker Gaius Rabirius Postumus.

In 58 BC the Romans annexed Cyprus and on accusations of piracy drove Ptolemy of Cyprus, Ptolemy XII's brother, to commit suicide instead of enduring exile to Paphos. Ptolemy XII remained publicly silent on the death of his brother, a decision which, along with ceding traditional Ptolemaic territory to the Romans, damaged his credibility among subjects already enraged by his economic policies. Ptolemy XII was then exiled from Egypt by force, traveling first to Rhodes, then Athens, and finally the villa of triumvir Pompey in the Alban Hills, near Praeneste, Italy. Ptolemy XII spent nearly a year there on the outskirts of Rome, ostensibly accompanied by his daughter Cleopatra, then about 11. Berenice IV sent an embassy to Rome to advocate for her rule and oppose the reinstatement of her father Ptolemy XII, but Ptolemy had assassins kill the leaders of the embassy, an incident that was covered up by his powerful Roman supporters. When the Roman Senate denied Ptolemy XII the offer of an armed escort and provisions for a return to Egypt, he decided to leave Rome in late 57 BC and reside at the Temple of Artemis in Ephesus.

The Roman financiers of Ptolemy XII remained determined to restore him to power. Pompey persuaded Aulus Gabinius, the Roman governor of Syria, to invade Egypt and restore Ptolemy XII, offering him 10,000 talents for the proposed mission. Although it put him at odds with Roman law, Gabinius invaded Egypt in the spring of 55 BC by way of Hasmonean Judea, where Hyrcanus II had Antipater the Idumaean, father of Herod the Great, furnish the Roman-led army with supplies. As a young cavalry officer, Mark Antony was under Gabinius's command. He distinguished himself by preventing Ptolemy XII from massacring the inhabitants of Pelousion, and for rescuing the body of Archelaos, the husband of Berenice IV, after he was killed in battle, ensuring him a proper royal burial. Cleopatra, then 14 years of age, would have traveled with the Roman expedition into Egypt; years later, Antony would profess that he had fallen in love with her at this time.

Gabinius was put on trial in Rome for abusing his authority, for which he was acquitted, but his second trial for accepting bribes led to his exile, from which he was recalled seven years later in 48 BC by Caesar. Crassus replaced him as governor of Syria and extended his provincial command to Egypt, but he was killed by the Parthians at the Battle of Carrhae in 53 BC. Ptolemy XII had Berenice IV and her wealthy supporters executed, seizing their properties. He allowed Gabinius's largely Germanic and Gallic Roman garrison, the Gabiniani, to harass people in the streets of Alexandria and installed his longtime Roman financier Rabirius as his chief financial officer. Within a year Rabirius was placed under protective custody and sent back to Rome after his life was endangered for draining Egypt of its resources. Despite these problems, Ptolemy XII created a will designating Cleopatra and Ptolemy XIII as his joint heirs, oversaw major construction projects such as the Temple of Edfu and a temple at Dendera, and stabilized the economy. On 31 May 52 BC, Cleopatra was made a regent of Ptolemy XII, as indicated by an inscription in the Temple of Hathor at Dendera. Rabirius was unable to collect the entirety of Ptolemy XII's debt by the time of the latter's death, and so it was passed on to his successors Cleopatra and Ptolemy XIII.

Accession to the throne

Ptolemy XII died sometime before 22 March 51 BC, when Cleopatra, in her first act as queen, began her voyage to Hermonthis, near Thebes, to install a new sacred Buchis bull, worshiped as an intermediary for the god Montu in the Ancient Egyptian religion. Cleopatra faced several pressing issues and emergencies shortly after taking the throne. These included famine caused by drought and a low level of the annual flooding of the Nile, and lawless behavior instigated by the Gabiniani, the now unemployed and assimilated Roman soldiers left by Gabinius to garrison Egypt. Inheriting her father's debts, Cleopatra also owed the Roman Republic 17.5 million drachmas.

In 50 BC Marcus Calpurnius Bibulus, proconsul of Syria, sent his two eldest sons to Egypt, most likely to negotiate with the Gabiniani and recruit them as soldiers in the desperate defense of Syria against the Parthians. However, the Gabiniani tortured and murdered these two, perhaps with secret encouragement by rogue senior administrators in Cleopatra's court. Cleopatra sent the Gabiniani culprits to Bibulus as prisoners awaiting his judgment, but he sent them back to Cleopatra and chastised her for interfering in their adjudication, which was the prerogative of the Roman Senate. Bibulus, siding with Pompey in Caesar's Civil War, failed to prevent Caesar from landing a naval fleet in Greece, which ultimately allowed Caesar to reach Egypt in pursuit of Pompey.

By 29 August 51 BC, official documents started listing Cleopatra as the sole ruler, evidence that she had rejected her brother Ptolemy XIII as a co-ruler. She had probably married him, but there is no record of this. The Ptolemaic practice of sibling marriage was introduced by Ptolemy II and his sister Arsinoe II. A long-held royal Egyptian practice, it was loathed by contemporary Greeks. By the reign of Cleopatra, however, it was considered a normal arrangement for Ptolemaic rulers.

Despite Cleopatra's rejection of him, Ptolemy XIII still retained powerful allies, notably the eunuch Potheinos, his childhood tutor, regent, and administrator of his properties. Others involved in the cabal against Cleopatra included Achillas, a prominent military commander, and Theodotus of Chios, another tutor of Ptolemy XIII. Cleopatra seems to have attempted a short-lived alliance with her brother Ptolemy XIV, but by the autumn of 50 BC Ptolemy XIII had the upper hand in their conflict and began signing documents with his name before that of his sister, followed by the establishment of his first regnal date in 49 BC.

Assassination of Pompey

In the summer of 49 BC, Cleopatra and her forces were still fighting against Ptolemy XIII within Alexandria when Pompey's son Gnaeus Pompeius arrived, seeking military aid on behalf of his father. After returning to Italy from the wars in Gaul and crossing the Rubicon in January of 49 BC, Caesar had forced Pompey and his supporters to flee to Greece. In perhaps their last joint decree, both Cleopatra and Ptolemy XIII agreed to Gnaeus Pompeius's request and sent his father 60 ships and 500 troops, including the Gabiniani, a move that helped erase some of the debt owed to Rome. Losing the fight against her brother, Cleopatra was then forced to flee Alexandria and withdraw to the region of Thebes. By the spring of 48 BC Cleopatra had traveled to Roman Syria with her younger sister, Arsinoe IV, to gather an invasion force that would head to Egypt. She returned with an army, but her advance to Alexandria was blocked by her brother's forces, including some Gabiniani mobilized to fight against her, so she camped outside Pelousion in the eastern Nile Delta.

In Greece, Caesar and Pompey's forces engaged each other at the decisive Battle of Pharsalus on 9August 48 BC, leading to the destruction of most of Pompey's army and his forced flight to Tyre, Lebanon. Given his close relationship with the Ptolemies, Pompey ultimately decided that Egypt would be his place of refuge, where he could replenish his forces. Ptolemy XIII's advisers, however, feared the idea of Pompey using Egypt as his base in a protracted Roman civil war. In a scheme devised by Theodotus, Pompey arrived by ship near Pelousion after being invited by a written message, only to be ambushed and stabbed to death on 28 September 48 BC. Ptolemy XIII believed he had demonstrated his power and simultaneously defused the situation by having Pompey's head, severed and embalmed, sent to Caesar, who arrived in Alexandria by early October and took up residence at the royal palace. Caesar expressed grief and outrage over the killing of Pompey and called on both Ptolemy XIII and Cleopatra to disband their forces and reconcile with each other.

Relationship with Julius Caesar

Ptolemy XIII arrived at Alexandria at the head of his army, in clear defiance of Caesar's demand that he disband and leave his army before his arrival. Cleopatra initially sent emissaries to Caesar, but upon allegedly hearing that Caesar was inclined to having affairs with royal women, she came to Alexandria to see him personally. Historian Cassius Dio records that she did so without informing her brother, dressed in an attractive manner, and charmed Caesar with her wit. Plutarch provides an entirely different and perhaps mythical account that alleges she was bound inside a bed sack to be smuggled into the palace to meet Caesar.

When Ptolemy XIII realized that his sister was in the palace consorting directly with Caesar, he attempted to rouse the populace of Alexandria into a riot, but he was arrested by Caesar, who used his oratorical skills to calm the frenzied crowd. Caesar then brought Cleopatra and Ptolemy XIII before the assembly of Alexandria, where Caesar revealed the written will of Ptolemy XII—previously possessed by Pompey—naming Cleopatra and Ptolemy XIII as his joint heirs. Caesar then attempted to arrange for the other two siblings, Arsinoe IV and Ptolemy XIV, to rule together over Cyprus, thus removing potential rival claimants to the Egyptian throne while also appeasing the Ptolemaic subjects still bitter over the loss of Cyprus to the Romans in 58 BC.

Judging that this agreement favored Cleopatra over Ptolemy XIII and that the latter's army of 20,000, including the Gabiniani, could most likely defeat Caesar's army of 4,000 unsupported troops, Potheinos decided to have Achillas lead their forces to Alexandria to attack both Caesar and Cleopatra. After Caesar managed to execute Potheinos, Arsinoe IV joined forces with Achillas and was declared queen, but soon afterward had her tutor Ganymedes kill Achillas and take his position as commander of her army. Ganymedes then tricked Caesar into requesting the presence of the erstwhile captive Ptolemy XIII as a negotiator, only to have him join the army of Arsinoe IV. The resulting siege of the palace, with Caesar and Cleopatra trapped together inside, lasted into the following year of 47 BC.

Sometime between January and March of 47 BC, Caesar's reinforcements arrived, including those led by Mithridates of Pergamon and Antipater the Idumaean. Ptolemy XIII and Arsinoe IV withdrew their forces to the Nile, where Caesar attacked them. Ptolemy XIII tried to flee by boat, but it capsized, and he drowned. Ganymedes may have been killed in the battle. Theodotus was found years later in Asia, by Marcus Junius Brutus, and executed. Arsinoe IV was forcefully paraded in Caesar's triumph in Rome before being exiled to the Temple of Artemis at Ephesus. Cleopatra was conspicuously absent from these events and resided in the palace, most likely because she had been pregnant with Caesar's child since September 48 BC.

Caesar's term as consul had expired at the end of 48 BC. However, Antony, an officer of his, helped to secure Caesar's appointment as dictator lasting for a year, until October 47 BC, providing Caesar with the legal authority to settle the dynastic dispute in Egypt. Wary of repeating the mistake of Cleopatra's sister Berenice IV in having a female monarch as sole ruler, Caesar appointed Cleopatra's 12-year-old brother, Ptolemy XIV, as joint ruler with the 22-year-old Cleopatra in a nominal sibling marriage, but Cleopatra continued living privately with Caesar. The exact date at which Cyprus was returned to her control is not known, although she had a governor there by 42 BC.

Caesar is alleged to have joined Cleopatra for a cruise of the Nile and sightseeing of Egyptian monuments, although this may be a romantic tale reflecting later well-to-do Roman proclivities and not a real historical event. Caesar could have had an interest in the Nile cruise owing to his fascination with geography; he was well-read in the works of Eratosthenes and Pytheas, and perhaps wanted to discover the source of the river, but turned back before reaching Ethiopia.

Caesar departed from Egypt around April 47 BC, allegedly to confront Pharnaces II of Pontus, the son of Mithridates VI of Pontus, who was stirring up trouble for Rome in Anatolia. It is possible that Caesar, married to the prominent Roman woman Calpurnia, also wanted to avoid being seen together with Cleopatra when she bore him their son. He left three legions in Egypt, later increased to four, under the command of the freedman Rufio, to secure Cleopatra's tenuous position, but also perhaps to keep her activities in check.

Caesarion, Cleopatra's alleged child with Caesar, was born 23 June 47 BC and was originally named "Pharaoh Caesar", as preserved on a stele at the Serapeum of Saqqara. Perhaps owing to his still childless marriage with Calpurnia, Caesar remained publicly silent about Caesarion (but perhaps accepted his parentage in private). Cleopatra, on the other hand, made repeated official declarations about Caesarion's parentage, naming Caesar as the father.

Cleopatra and her nominal joint ruler Ptolemy XIV visited Rome sometime in late 46 BC, presumably without Caesarion, and were given lodging in Caesar's villa within the Horti Caesaris. As with their father Ptolemy XII, Caesar awarded both Cleopatra and Ptolemy XIV the legal status of "friend and ally of the Roman people", in effect client rulers loyal to Rome. Cleopatra's visitors at Caesar's villa across the Tiber included the senator Cicero, who found her arrogant. Sosigenes of Alexandria, one of the members of Cleopatra's court, aided Caesar in the calculations for the new Julian calendar, put into effect 1January 45 BC. The Temple of Venus Genetrix, established in the Forum of Caesar on 25 September 46 BC, contained a golden statue of Cleopatra (which stood there at least until the 3rd century AD), associating the mother of Caesar's child directly with the goddess Venus, mother of the Romans. The statue also subtly linked the Egyptian goddess Isis with the Roman religion.

Cleopatra's presence in Rome most likely had an effect on the events at the Lupercalia festival a month before Caesar's assassination. Antony attempted to place a royal diadem on Caesar's head, but the latter refused in what was most likely a staged performance, perhaps to gauge the Roman public's mood about accepting Hellenistic-style kingship. Cicero, who was present at the festival, mockingly asked where the diadem came from, an obvious reference to the Ptolemaic queen whom he abhorred. Caesar was assassinated on the Ides of March (15 March 44 BC), but Cleopatra stayed in Rome until about mid-April, in the vain hope of having Caesarion recognized as Caesar's heir. However, Caesar's will named his grandnephew Octavian as the primary heir, and Octavian arrived in Italy around the same time Cleopatra decided to depart for Egypt. A few months later, Cleopatra had Ptolemy XIV killed by poisoning, elevating her son Caesarion as her co-ruler.

Cleopatra in the Liberators' civil war

Octavian, Antony, and Marcus Aemilius Lepidus formed the Second Triumvirate in 43 BC, in which they were each elected for five-year terms to restore order in the Republic and bring Caesar's assassins to justice. Cleopatra received messages from both Gaius Cassius Longinus, one of Caesar's assassins, and Publius Cornelius Dolabella, proconsul of Syria and Caesarian loyalist, requesting military aid. She decided to write Cassius an excuse that her kingdom faced too many internal problems, while sending the four legions left by Caesar in Egypt to Dolabella. However, these troops were captured by Cassius in Palestine. While Serapion, Cleopatra's governor of Cyprus, defected to Cassius and provided him with ships, Cleopatra took her own fleet to Greece to personally assist Octavian and Antony, but her ships were heavily damaged in a Mediterranean storm and she arrived too late to aid in the fighting. By the autumn of 42 BC, Antony had defeated the forces of Caesar's assassins at the Battle of Philippi in Greece, leading to the suicide of Cassius and Brutus.

By the end of 42 BC, Octavian had gained control over much of the western half of the Roman Republic and Antony the eastern half, with Lepidus largely marginalized. In the summer of 41 BC, Antony established his headquarters at Tarsos in Anatolia and summoned Cleopatra there in several letters, which she rebuffed until Antony's envoy Quintus Dellius convinced her to come. The meeting would allow Cleopatra to clear up the misconception that she had supported Cassius during the civil war and address territorial exchanges in the Levant, but Antony also undoubtedly desired to form a personal, romantic relationship with the queen. Cleopatra sailed up the Kydnos River to Tarsos in Thalamegos, hosting Antony and his officers for two nights of lavish banquets on board the ship. Cleopatra managed to clear her name as a supposed supporter of Cassius, arguing she had really attempted to help Dolabella in Syria, and convinced Antony to have her exiled sister, Arsinoe IV, executed at Ephesus. Cleopatra's former rebellious governor of Cyprus was also handed over to her for execution.

Relationship with Mark Antony

Cleopatra invited Antony to come to Egypt before departing from Tarsos, which led Antony to visit Alexandria by November 41 BC. Antony was well received by the populace of Alexandria, both for his heroic actions in restoring Ptolemy XII to power and coming to Egypt without an occupation force like Caesar had done. In Egypt, Antony continued to enjoy the lavish royal lifestyle he had witnessed aboard Cleopatra's ship docked at Tarsos. He also had his subordinates, such as Publius Ventidius Bassus, drive the Parthians out of Anatolia and Syria.

Cleopatra carefully chose Antony as her partner for producing further heirs, as he was deemed to be the most powerful Roman figure following Caesar's demise. With his powers as a triumvir, Antony also had the broad authority to restore former Ptolemaic lands, which were currently in Roman hands, to Cleopatra. While it is clear that both Cilicia and Cyprus were under Cleopatra's control by 19 November 38 BC, the transfer probably occurred earlier in the winter of 41–40 BC, during her time spent with Antony.

By the spring of 40 BC, Antony left Egypt due to troubles in Syria, where his governor Lucius Decidius Saxa was killed and his army taken by Quintus Labienus, a former officer under Cassius who now served the Parthian Empire. Cleopatra provided Antony with 200 ships for his campaign and as payment for her newly acquired territories. She would not see Antony again until 37 BC, but she maintained correspondence, and evidence suggests she kept a spy in his camp. By the end of 40 BC, Cleopatra had given birth to twins, a boy named Alexander Helios and a girl named Cleopatra Selene II, both of whom Antony acknowledged as his children. Helios (the Sun) and Selene (the Moon) were symbolic of a new era of societal rejuvenation, as well as an indication that Cleopatra hoped Antony would repeat the exploits of Alexander the Great by conquering the Parthians.

Mark Antony's Parthian campaign in the east was disrupted by the events of the Perusine War (41–40 BC), initiated by his ambitious wife Fulvia against Octavian in the hopes of making her husband the undisputed leader of Rome. It has been suggested that Fulvia wanted to cleave Antony away from Cleopatra, but the conflict emerged in Italy even before Cleopatra's meeting with Antony at Tarsos. Fulvia and Antony's brother Lucius Antonius were eventually besieged by Octavian at Perusia (modern Perugia, Italy) and then exiled from Italy, after which Fulvia died at Sicyon in Greece while attempting to reach Antony. Her sudden death led to a reconciliation of Octavian and Antony at Brundisium in Italy in September 40 BC. Although the agreement struck at Brundisium solidified Antony's control of the Roman Republic's territories east of the Ionian Sea, it also stipulated that he concede Italia, Hispania, and Gaul, and marry Octavian's sister Octavia the Younger, a potential rival for Cleopatra.

In December 40 BC Cleopatra received Herod in Alexandria as an unexpected guest and refugee who fled a turbulent situation in Judea. Herod had been installed as a tetrarch there by Antony, but he was soon at odds with Antigonus II Mattathias of the long-established Hasmonean dynasty. The latter had imprisoned Herod's brother and fellow tetrarch Phasael, who was executed while Herod was fleeing toward Cleopatra's court. Cleopatra attempted to provide him with a military assignment, but Herod declined and traveled to Rome, where the triumvirs Octavian and Antony named him king of Judea. This act put Herod on a collision course with Cleopatra, who would desire to reclaim the former Ptolemaic territories that comprised his new Herodian kingdom.

Relations between Antony and Cleopatra perhaps soured when he not only married Octavia, but also sired her two children, Antonia the Elder in 39 BC and Antonia Minor in 36 BC, and moved his headquarters to Athens. However, Cleopatra's position in Egypt was secure. Her rival Herod was occupied with civil war in Judea that required heavy Roman military assistance, but received none from Cleopatra. Since the authority of Antony and Octavian as triumvirs had expired on 1January 37 BC, Octavia arranged for a meeting at Tarentum, where the triumvirate was officially extended to 33 BC. With two legions granted by Octavian and a thousand soldiers lent by Octavia, Antony traveled to Antioch, where he made preparations for war against the Parthians.

Antony summoned Cleopatra to Antioch to discuss pressing issues, such as Herod's kingdom and financial support for his Parthian campaign. Cleopatra brought her now three-year-old twins to Antioch, where Antony saw them for the first time and where they probably first received their surnames Helios and Selene as part of Antony and Cleopatra's ambitious plans for the future. In order to stabilize the east, Antony not only enlarged Cleopatra's domain, he also established new ruling dynasties and client rulers who would be loyal to him, yet would ultimately outlast him.

In this arrangement Cleopatra gained significant former Ptolemaic territories in the Levant, including nearly all of Phoenicia (Lebanon) minus Tyre and Sidon, which remained in Roman hands. She also received Ptolemais Akko (modern Acre, Israel), a city that was established by Ptolemy II. Given her ancestral relations with the Seleucids, she was granted the region of Coele-Syria along the upper Orontes River. She was even given the region surrounding Jericho in Palestine, but she leased this territory back to Herod. At the expense of the Nabataean king Malichus I (a cousin of Herod), Cleopatra was also given a portion of the Nabataean Kingdom around the Gulf of Aqaba on the Red Sea, including Ailana (modern Aqaba, Jordan). To the west Cleopatra was handed Cyrene along the Libyan coast, as well as Itanos and Olous in Roman Crete. Although still administered by Roman officials, these territories nevertheless enriched her kingdom and led her to declare the inauguration of a new era by double-dating her coinage in 36 BC.

Antony's enlargement of the Ptolemaic realm by relinquishing directly controlled Roman territory was exploited by his rival Octavian, who tapped into the public sentiment in Rome against the empowerment of a foreign queen at the expense of their Republic. Octavian, fostering the narrative that Antony was neglecting his virtuous Roman wife Octavia, granted both her and Livia, his own wife, extraordinary privileges of sacrosanctity. Some 50 years before, Cornelia Africana, daughter of Scipio Africanus, had been the first living Roman woman to have a statue dedicated to her. She was now followed by Octavia and Livia, whose statues were most likely erected in the Forum of Caesar to rival that of Cleopatra's, erected by Caesar.

In 36 BC, Cleopatra accompanied Antony to the Euphrates in his journey toward invading the Parthian Empire. She then returned to Egypt, perhaps due to her advanced state of pregnancy. By the summer of 36 BC, she had given birth to Ptolemy Philadelphus, her second son with Antony.

Antony's Parthian campaign in 36 BC turned into a complete debacle for a number of reasons, in particular the betrayal of Artavasdes II of Armenia, who defected to the Parthian side. After losing some 30,000 men, more than Crassus at Carrhae (an indignity he had hoped to avenge), Antony finally arrived at Leukokome near Berytus (modern Beirut, Lebanon) in December, engaged in heavy drinking before Cleopatra arrived to provide funds and clothing for his battered troops. Antony desired to avoid the risks involved in returning to Rome, and so he traveled with Cleopatra back to Alexandria to see his newborn son.

Donations of Alexandria

As Antony prepared for another Parthian expedition in 35 BC, this time aimed at their ally Armenia, Octavia traveled to Athens with 2,000 troops in alleged support of Antony, but most likely in a scheme devised by Octavian to embarrass him for his military losses. Antony received these troops but told Octavia not to stray east of Athens as he and Cleopatra traveled together to Antioch, only to suddenly and inexplicably abandon the military campaign and head back to Alexandria. When Octavia returned to Rome Octavian portrayed his sister as a victim wronged by Antony, although she refused to leave Antony's household. Octavian's confidence grew as he eliminated his rivals in the west, including Sextus Pompeius and even Lepidus, the third member of the triumvirate, who was placed under house arrest after revolting against Octavian in Sicily.

Dellius was sent as Antony's envoy to Artavasdes II in 34 BC to negotiate a potential marriage alliance that would wed the Armenian king's daughter to Alexander Helios, the son of Antony and Cleopatra. When this was declined, Antony marched his army into Armenia, defeated their forces and captured the king and Armenian royal family. Antony then held a military parade in Alexandria as an imitation of a Roman triumph, dressed as Dionysus and riding into the city on a chariot to present the royal prisoners to Cleopatra, who was seated on a golden throne above a silver dais. News of this event was heavily criticized in Rome as a perversion of time-honored Roman rites and rituals to be enjoyed instead by an Egyptian queen.

In an event held at the gymnasium soon after the triumph, Cleopatra dressed as Isis and declared that she was the Queen of Kings with her son Caesarion, King of Kings, while Alexander Helios was declared king of Armenia, Media, and Parthia, and two-year-old Ptolemy Philadelphos was declared king of Syria and Cilicia. Cleopatra Selene II was bestowed with Crete and Cyrene. Antony and Cleopatra may have been wed during this ceremony. Antony sent a report to Rome requesting ratification of these territorial claims, now known as the Donations of Alexandria. Octavian wanted to publicize it for propaganda purposes, but the two consuls, both supporters of Antony, had it censored from public view.

In late 34 BC, Antony and Octavian engaged in a heated war of propaganda that would last for years. Antony claimed that his rival had illegally deposed Lepidus from their triumvirate and barred him from raising troops in Italy, while Octavian accused Antony of unlawfully detaining the king of Armenia, marrying Cleopatra despite still being married to his sister Octavia, and wrongfully claiming Caesarion as the heir of Caesar instead of Octavian. The litany of accusations and gossip associated with this propaganda war have shaped the popular perceptions about Cleopatra from Augustan-period literature through to various media in modern times. Cleopatra was said to have brainwashed Mark Antony with witchcraft and sorcery and was as dangerous as Homer's Helen of Troy in destroying civilization. Pliny the Elder claims in his Natural History that Cleopatra once dissolved a pearl worth tens of millions of sesterces in vinegar just to win a dinner-party bet. The accusation that Antony had stolen books from the Library of Pergamum to restock the Library of Alexandria later turned out to be an admitted fabrication by Gaius Calvisius Sabinus.

A papyrus document dated to February 33 BC, later used to wrap a mummy, contains the signature of Cleopatra, probably written by an official authorized to sign for her. It concerns certain tax exemptions in Egypt granted to either Quintus Caecillius or Publius Canidius Crassus, a former Roman consul and Antony's confidant who would command his land forces at Actium. A subscript in a different handwriting at the bottom of the papyrus reads "make it happen" or "so be it"; this is likely the autograph of the queen, as it was Ptolemaic practice to countersign documents to avoid forgery.

Battle of Actium

In a speech to the Roman Senate on the first day of his consulship on 1January 33 BC, Octavian accused Antony of attempting to subvert Roman freedoms and territorial integrity as a slave to his Oriental queen. Before Antony and Octavian's joint imperium expired on 31 December 33 BC, Antony declared Caesarion as the true heir of Caesar in an attempt to undermine Octavian. In 32 BC, the Antonian loyalists Gaius Sosius and Gnaeus Domitius Ahenobarbus became consuls. The former gave a fiery speech condemning Octavian, now a private citizen without public office, and introduced pieces of legislation against him. During the next senatorial session, Octavian entered the Senate house with armed guards and levied his own accusations against the consuls. Intimidated by this act, the consuls and over 200 senators still in support of Antony fled Rome the next day to join the side of Antony.

Antony and Cleopatra traveled together to Ephesus in 32 BC, where she provided him with 200 of the 800 naval ships he was able to acquire. Ahenobarbus, wary of having Octavian's propaganda confirmed to the public, attempted to persuade Antony to have Cleopatra excluded from the campaign against Octavian. Publius Canidius Crassus made the counterargument that Cleopatra was funding the war effort and was a competent monarch. Cleopatra refused Antony's requests that she return to Egypt, judging that by blocking Octavian in Greece she could more easily defend Egypt. Cleopatra's insistence that she be involved in the battle for Greece led to the defections of prominent Romans, such as Ahenobarbus and Lucius Munatius Plancus.

During the spring of 32 BC Antony and Cleopatra traveled to Athens, where she persuaded Antony to send Octavia an official declaration of divorce. This encouraged Plancus to advise Octavian that he should seize Antony's will, invested with the Vestal Virgins. Although a violation of sacred and legal rights, Octavian forcefully acquired the document from the Temple of Vesta, and it became a useful tool in the propaganda war against Antony and Cleopatra. Octavian highlighted parts of the will, such as Caesarion being named heir to Caesar, that the Donations of Alexandria were legal, that Antony should be buried alongside Cleopatra in Egypt instead of Rome, and that Alexandria would be made the new capital of the Roman Republic. In a show of loyalty to Rome, Octavian decided to begin construction of his own mausoleum at the Campus Martius. Octavian's legal standing was also improved by being elected consul in 31 BC. With Antony's will made public, Octavian had his casus belli, and Rome declared war on Cleopatra, not Antony. The legal argument for war was based less on Cleopatra's territorial acquisitions, with former Roman territories ruled by her children with Antony, and more on the fact that she was providing military support to a private citizen now that Antony's triumviral authority had expired.

Antony and Cleopatra had a larger fleet than Octavian, but the crews of Antony and Cleopatra's navy were not all well-trained, some of them perhaps from merchant vessels, whereas Octavian had a fully professional force. Antony wanted to cross the Adriatic Sea and blockade Octavian at either Tarentum or Brundisium, but Cleopatra, concerned primarily with defending Egypt, overrode the decision to attack Italy directly. Antony and Cleopatra set up their winter headquarters at Patrai in Greece, and by the spring of 31 BC they had moved to Actium, on the southern side of the Ambracian Gulf.

Cleopatra and Antony had the support of various allied kings, but Cleopatra had already been in conflict with Herod, and an earthquake in Judea provided him with an excuse to be absent from the campaign. They also lost the support of Malichus I, which would prove to have strategic consequences. Antony and Cleopatra lost several skirmishes against Octavian around Actium during the summer of 31 BC, while defections to Octavian's camp continued, including Antony's long-time companion Dellius and the allied kings Amyntas of Galatia and Deiotaros of Paphlagonia. While some in Antony's camp suggested abandoning the naval conflict to retreat inland, Cleopatra urged for a naval confrontation, to keep Octavian's fleet away from Egypt.

On 2 September 31 BC the naval forces of Octavian, led by Marcus Vipsanius Agrippa, met those of Antony and Cleopatra at the Battle of Actium. Cleopatra, aboard her flagship, the Antonias, commanded 60 ships at the mouth of the Ambracian Gulf, at the rear of the fleet, in what was likely a move by Antony's officers to marginalize her during the battle. Antony had ordered that their ships should have sails on board for a better chance to pursue or flee from the enemy, which Cleopatra, ever concerned about defending Egypt, used to swiftly move through the area of major combat in a strategic withdrawal to the Peloponnese. Burstein writes that partisan Roman writers would later accuse Cleopatra of cowardly deserting Antony, but their original intention of keeping their sails on board may have been to break the blockade and salvage as much of their fleet as possible. Antony followed Cleopatra and boarded her ship, identified by its distinctive purple sails, as the two escaped the battle and headed for Tainaron. Antony reportedly avoided Cleopatra during this three-day voyage, until her ladies in waiting at Tainaron urged him to speak with her. The Battle of Actium raged on without Cleopatra and Antony until the morning of 3September, and was followed by massive defections of officers, troops, and allied kings to Octavian's side.

Downfall and death

While Octavian occupied Athens, Antony and Cleopatra landed at Paraitonion in Egypt. The couple then went their separate ways, Antony to Cyrene to raise more troops and Cleopatra to the harbor at Alexandria in an attempt to mislead the oppositional party and portray the activities in Greece as a victory. She was afraid that news about the outcome of the battle of Actium would lead to a rebellion. It is uncertain whether or not, at this time, she actually executed Artavasdes II and sent his head to his rival, Artavasdes I of Media Atropatene, in an attempt to strike an alliance with him.

Lucius Pinarius, Mark Antony's appointed governor of Cyrene, received word that Octavian had won the Battle of Actium before Antony's messengers could arrive at his court. Pinarius had these messengers executed and then defected to Octavian's side, surrendering to him the four legions under his command that Antony desired to obtain. Antony nearly committed suicide after hearing news of this but was stopped by his staff officers. In Alexandria he built a reclusive cottage on the island of Pharos that he nicknamed the Timoneion, after the philosopher Timon of Athens, who was famous for his cynicism and misanthropy. Herod, who had personally advised Antony after the Battle of Actium that he should betray Cleopatra, traveled to Rhodes to meet Octavian and resign his kingship out of loyalty to Antony. Octavian was impressed by his speech and sense of loyalty, so he allowed him to maintain his position in Judea, further isolating Antony and Cleopatra.

Cleopatra perhaps started to view Antony as a liability by the late summer of 31 BC, when she prepared to leave Egypt to her son Caesarion. Cleopatra planned to relinquish her throne to him, take her fleet from the Mediterranean into the Red Sea, and then set sail to a foreign port, perhaps in India, where she could spend time recuperating. However, these plans were ultimately abandoned when Malichus I, as advised by Octavian's governor of Syria, Quintus Didius, managed to burn Cleopatra's fleet in revenge for his losses in a war with Herod that Cleopatra had largely initiated. Cleopatra had no other option but to stay in Egypt and negotiate with Octavian. Although most likely later pro-Octavian propaganda, it was reported that at this time Cleopatra started testing the strengths of various poisons on prisoners and even her own servants.

Cleopatra had Caesarion enter into the ranks of the ephebi, which, along with reliefs on a stele from Koptos dated 21 September 31 BC, demonstrated that Cleopatra was now grooming her son to become the sole ruler of Egypt. In a show of solidarity, Antony also had Marcus Antonius Antyllus, his son with Fulvia, enter the ephebi at the same time. Separate messages and envoys from Antony and Cleopatra were then sent to Octavian, still stationed at Rhodes, although Octavian seems to have replied only to Cleopatra. Cleopatra requested that her children should inherit Egypt and that Antony should be allowed to live in exile in Egypt, offered Octavian money in the future, and immediately sent him lavish gifts. Octavian sent his diplomat Thyrsos to Cleopatra after she threatened to burn herself and vast amounts of her treasure within a tomb already under construction. Thyrsos advised her to kill Antony so that her life would be spared, but when Antony suspected foul intent, he had this diplomat flogged and sent back to Octavian without a deal.

After lengthy negotiations that ultimately produced no results, Octavian set out to invade Egypt in the spring of 30 BC, stopping at Ptolemais in Phoenicia, where his new ally Herod provided his army with fresh supplies. Octavian moved south and swiftly took Pelousion, while Cornelius Gallus, marching eastward from Cyrene, defeated Antony's forces near Paraitonion. Octavian advanced quickly to Alexandria, but Antony returned and won a small victory over Octavian's tired troops outside the city's hippodrome. However, on 1 August 30 BC, Antony's naval fleet surrendered to Octavian, followed by Antony's cavalry. Cleopatra hid herself in her tomb with her close attendants and sent a message to Antony that she had committed suicide. In despair, Antony responded to this by stabbing himself in the stomach and taking his own life at age 53. According to Plutarch, he was still dying when brought to Cleopatra at her tomb, telling her he had died honorably and that she could trust Octavian's companion Gaius Proculeius over anyone else in his entourage. It was Proculeius, however, who infiltrated her tomb using a ladder and detained the queen, denying her the ability to burn herself with her treasures. Cleopatra was then allowed to embalm and bury Antony within her tomb before she was escorted to the palace.

Octavian entered Alexandria, occupied the palace, and seized Cleopatra's three youngest children. When she met with Octavian, Cleopatra told him bluntly, "I will not be led in a triumph", according to Livy, a rare recording of her exact words. Octavian promised that he would keep her alive but offered no explanation about his future plans for her kingdom. When a spy informed her that Octavian planned to move her and her children to Rome in three days, she prepared for suicide as she had no intentions of being paraded in a Roman triumph like her sister Arsinoe IV. It is unclear if Cleopatra's suicide on 10 August 30 BC, at age 39, took place within the palace or her tomb. It is said she was accompanied by her servants Eiras and Charmion, who also took their own lives. Octavian was said to have been angered by this outcome but had Cleopatra buried in royal fashion next to Antony in her tomb. Cleopatra's physician Olympos did not explain her cause of death, although the popular belief is that she allowed an asp or Egyptian cobra to bite and poison her. Plutarch relates this tale, but then suggests an implement ( 'spine, cheese-grater') was used to introduce the toxin by scratching, while Dio says that she injected the poison with a needle, and Strabo argued for an ointment of some kind. No venomous snake was found with her body, but she did have tiny puncture wounds on her arm that could have been caused by a needle.

Cleopatra decided in her last moments to send Caesarion away to Upper Egypt, perhaps with plans to flee to Kushite Nubia, Ethiopia, or India. Caesarion, now Ptolemy XV, would reign for a mere 18 days until executed on the orders of Octavian on 29 August 30 BC, after returning to Alexandria under the false pretense that Octavian would allow him to be king. Octavian was convinced by the advice of the philosopher Arius Didymus that there was room for only one Caesar in the world. With the fall of the Ptolemaic Kingdom, the Roman province of Egypt was established, marking the end of the Hellenistic period. In January of 27 BC Octavian was renamed Augustus ("the revered") and amassed constitutional powers that established him as the first Roman emperor, inaugurating the Principate era of the Roman Empire.

Cleopatra's kingdom and role as a monarch

Following the tradition of Macedonian rulers, Cleopatra ruled Egypt and other territories such as Cyprus as an absolute monarch, serving as the sole lawgiver of her kingdom. She was the chief religious authority in her realm, presiding over religious ceremonies dedicated to the deities of both the Egyptian and Greek polytheistic faiths. She oversaw the construction of various temples to Egyptian and Greek gods, a synagogue for the Jews in Egypt, and even built the Caesareum of Alexandria, dedicated to the cult worship of her patron and lover Julius Caesar. Cleopatra was directly involved in the administrative affairs of her domain, tackling crises such as famine by ordering royal granaries to distribute food to the starving populace during a drought at the beginning of her reign. Although the command economy that she managed was more of an ideal than a reality, the government attempted to impose price controls, tariffs, and state monopolies for certain goods, fixed exchange rates for foreign currencies, and rigid laws forcing peasant farmers to stay in their villages during planting and harvesting seasons. Apparent financial troubles led Cleopatra to debase her coinage, which included silver and bronze currencies but no gold coins like those of some of her distant Ptolemaic predecessors.

Legacy

Children and successors

After her suicide, Cleopatra's three surviving children, Cleopatra Selene II, Alexander Helios, and Ptolemy Philadelphos, were sent to Rome with Octavian's sister Octavia the Younger, a former wife of their father, as their guardian. Cleopatra Selene II and Alexander Helios were present in the Roman triumph of Octavian in 29 BC. The fates of Alexander Helios and Ptolemy Philadelphus are unknown after this point. Octavia arranged the betrothal of Cleopatra Selene II to Juba II, son of Juba I, whose North African kingdom of Numidia had been turned into a Roman province in 46 BC by Julius Caesar due to Juba I's support of Pompey. The emperor Augustus installed Juba II and Cleopatra Selene II, after their wedding in 25 BC, as the new rulers of Mauretania, where they transformed the old Carthaginian city of Iol into their new capital, renamed Caesarea Mauretaniae (modern Cherchell, Algeria). Cleopatra Selene II imported many important scholars, artists, and advisers from her mother's royal court in Alexandria to serve her in Caesarea, now permeated in Hellenistic Greek culture. She also named her son Ptolemy of Mauretania, in honor of their Ptolemaic dynastic heritage.

Cleopatra Selene II died around 5 BC, and when Juba II died in 23/24 AD he was succeeded by his son Ptolemy. However, Ptolemy was eventually executed by the Roman emperor Caligula in 40 AD, perhaps under the pretense that Ptolemy had unlawfully minted his own royal coinage and utilized regalia reserved for the Roman emperor. Ptolemy of Mauretania was the last known monarch of the Ptolemaic dynasty, although Queen Zenobia, of the short-lived Palmyrene Empire during the Crisis of the Third Century, would claim descent from Cleopatra. A cult dedicated to Cleopatra still existed as late as 373 AD when Petesenufe, an Egyptian scribe of the book of Isis, explained that he "overlaid the figure of Cleopatra with gold."

Roman literature and historiography

Although almost 50 ancient works of Roman historiography mention Cleopatra, these often include only terse accounts of the Battle of Actium, her suicide, and Augustan propaganda about her personal deficiencies. Despite not being a biography of Cleopatra, the Life of Antonius written by Plutarch in the 1st century AD provides the most thorough surviving account of Cleopatra's life. Plutarch lived a century after Cleopatra but relied on primary sources, such as Philotas of Amphissa, who had access to the Ptolemaic royal palace, Cleopatra's personal physician named Olympos, and Quintus Dellius, a close confidant of Mark Antony and Cleopatra. Plutarch's work included both the Augustan view of Cleopatra—which became canonical for his period—as well as sources outside of this tradition, such as eyewitness reports. The Jewish Roman historian Josephus, writing in the 1st century AD, provides valuable information on the life of Cleopatra via her diplomatic relationship with Herod the Great. However, this work relies largely on Herod's memoirs and the biased account of Nicolaus of Damascus, the tutor of Cleopatra's children in Alexandria before he moved to Judea to serve as an adviser and chronicler at Herod's court. The Roman History published by the official and historian Cassius Dio in the early 3rd century AD, while failing to fully comprehend the complexities of the late Hellenistic world, nevertheless provides a continuous history of the era of Cleopatra's reign.

The writings of Cicero, who knew her personally, provide an unflattering portrait of Cleopatra. The Augustan-period authors Virgil, Horace, Propertius, and Ovid perpetuated the negative views of Cleopatra approved by the ruling Roman regime, although Virgil established the idea of Cleopatra as a figure of romance and epic melodrama. Horace also viewed Cleopatra's suicide as a positive choice, an idea that found acceptance by the Late Middle Ages with Geoffrey Chaucer. The historians Strabo, Velleius, Valerius Maximus, Pliny the Elder, and Appian, while not offering accounts as full as Plutarch, Josephus, or Dio, provided some details of her life that had not survived in other historical records. Inscriptions on contemporary Ptolemaic coinage and some Egyptian papyrus documents demonstrate Cleopatra's point of view, but this material is very limited in comparison to Roman literary works. The fragmentary Libyka commissioned by Cleopatra's son-in-law Juba II provides a glimpse at a possible body of historiographic material that supported Cleopatra's perspective.

Cleopatra's gender has perhaps led to her depiction as a minor if not insignificant figure in ancient, medieval, and even modern historiography about ancient Egypt and the Greco-Roman world. For instance, the historian Ronald Syme asserted that she was of little importance to Caesar and that the propaganda of Octavian magnified her importance to an excessive degree. Although the common view of Cleopatra was one of a prolific seductress, she had only two known sexual partners, Caesar and Antony, the two most prominent Romans of the time period, who were most likely to ensure the survival of her dynasty. Plutarch described Cleopatra as having had a stronger personality and charming wit than physical beauty.

Cultural depictions

Depictions in ancient art

Statues

Cleopatra was depicted in various ancient works of art, in the Egyptian as well as Hellenistic-Greek and Roman styles. Surviving works include statues, busts, reliefs, and minted coins, as well as ancient carved cameos, such as one depicting Cleopatra and Antony in Hellenistic style, now in the Altes Museum, Berlin. Contemporary images of Cleopatra were produced both in and outside of Ptolemaic Egypt. For instance, a large gilded bronze statue of Cleopatra once existed inside the Temple of Venus Genetrix in Rome, the first time that a living person had their statue placed next to that of a deity in a Roman temple. It was erected there by Caesar and remained in the temple at least until the 3rd century AD, its preservation perhaps owing to Caesar's patronage, although Augustus did not remove or destroy artworks in Alexandria depicting Cleopatra.

Plutarch, in his Life of Antonius, claimed that the public statues of Antony were torn down by Augustus, but those of Cleopatra were preserved following her death thanks to her friend Archibius paying the emperor 2,000 talents to dissuade him from destroying hers.

Detractors of this theory argue that the face in this statue is thinner than the face on the Berlin portrait and assert that it was unlikely she would be depicted as the naked goddess Venus (or the Greek Aphrodite). However, she was depicted in an Egyptian statue as the goddess Isis, while some of her coinage depicts her as Venus-Aphrodite. She also dressed as Aphrodite when meeting Antony at Tarsos. The Esquiline Venus is generally thought to be a mid-1st-century AD Roman copy of a 1st-century BC Greek original from the school of Pasiteles.

Coinage portraits

Surviving coinage of Cleopatra's reign include specimens from every regnal year, from 51 to 30 BC. Cleopatra, the only Ptolemaic queen to issue coins on her own behalf, almost certainly inspired her partner Caesar to become the first living Roman to present his portrait on his own coins. Cleopatra was also the first foreign queen to have her image appear on Roman currency. Coins dated to the period of her marriage to Antony, which also bear his image, portray the queen as having a very similar aquiline nose and prominent chin as that of her husband. These similar facial features followed an artistic convention that represented the mutually-observed harmony of a royal couple. Her strong, almost masculine facial features in these particular coins are strikingly different from the smoother, softer, and perhaps idealized sculpted images of her in either the Egyptian or Hellenistic styles. Her masculine facial features on minted currency are similar to that of her father, Ptolemy XII Auletes, and perhaps also to those of her Ptolemaic ancestor Arsinoe II (316–260 BC) and even depictions of earlier queens such as Hatshepsut and Nefertiti. It is likely, due to political expediency, that Antony's visage was made to conform not only to hers but also to those of her Macedonian Greek ancestors who founded the Ptolemaic dynasty, to familiarize himself to her subjects as a legitimate member of the royal house.

The inscriptions on the coins are written in Greek, but also in the nominative case of Roman coins rather than the genitive case of Greek coins, in addition to having the letters placed in a circular fashion along the edges of the coin instead of across it horizontally or vertically as was customary for Greek ones. These facets of their coinage represent the synthesis of Roman and Hellenistic culture, and perhaps also a statement to their subjects, however ambiguous to modern scholars, about the superiority of either Antony or Cleopatra over the other. Diana Kleiner argues that Cleopatra, in one of her coins minted with the dual image of her husband Antony, made herself more masculine-looking than other portraits and more like an acceptable Roman client queen than a Hellenistic ruler. Cleopatra had actually achieved this masculine look in coinage predating her affair with Antony, such as the coins struck at the Ashkelon mint during her brief period of exile to Syria and the Levant, which Joann Fletcher explains as her attempt to appear like her father and as a legitimate successor to a male Ptolemaic ruler.

Various coins, such as a silver tetradrachm minted sometime after Cleopatra's marriage with Antony in 37 BC, depict her wearing a royal diadem and a 'melon' hairstyle. The combination of this hairstyle with a diadem is also featured in two surviving sculpted marble heads. This hairstyle, with hair braided back into a bun, is the same as that worn by her Ptolemaic ancestors Arsinoe II and Berenice II in their own coinage. After her visit to Rome in 46–44 BC it became fashionable for Roman women to adopt it as one of their hairstyles, but it was abandoned for a more modest, austere look during the conservative rule of Augustus.

Greco-Roman busts and heads

Of the surviving Greco-Roman-style busts and heads of Cleopatra, the sculpture known as the "Berlin Cleopatra", located in the Antikensammlung Berlin collection at the Altes Museum, possesses her full nose, whereas the head known as the "Vatican Cleopatra", located in the Vatican Museums, is damaged with a missing nose. Both the Berlin Cleopatra and Vatican Cleopatra have royal diadems, similar facial features, and perhaps once resembled the face of her bronze statue housed in the Temple of Venus Genetrix. Both heads are dated to the mid-1st century BC and were found in Roman villas along the Via Appia in Italy, the Vatican Cleopatra having been unearthed in the Villa of the Quintilii. Francisco Pina Polo writes that Cleopatra's coinage present her image with certainty and asserts that the sculpted portrait of the Berlin head is confirmed as having a similar profile with her hair pulled back into a bun, a diadem, and a hooked nose. A third sculpted portrait of Cleopatra accepted by scholars as being authentic survives at the Archaeological Museum of Cherchell, Algeria. This portrait features the royal diadem and similar facial features as the Berlin and Vatican heads, but has a more unique hairstyle and may actually depict Cleopatra Selene II, daughter of Cleopatra. A possible Parian-marble sculpture of Cleopatra wearing a vulture headdress in Egyptian style is located at the Capitoline Museums. Discovered near a sanctuary of Isis in Rome and dated to the 1st century BC, it is either Roman or Hellenistic-Egyptian in origin.

Other possible sculpted depictions of Cleopatra include one in the British Museum, London, made of limestone, which perhaps only depicts a woman in her entourage during her trip to Rome. The woman in this portrait has facial features similar to others (including the pronounced aquiline nose), but lacks a royal diadem and sports a different hairstyle. However, the British Museum head, once belonging to a full statue, could potentially represent Cleopatra at a different stage in her life and may also betray an effort by Cleopatra to discard the use of royal insignia (i.e. the diadem) to make herself more appealing to the citizens of Republican Rome. Duane W. Roller speculates that the British Museum head, along with those in the Egyptian Museum, Cairo, the Capitoline Museums, and in the private collection of Maurice Nahmen, while having similar facial features and hairstyles as the Berlin portrait but lacking a royal diadem, most likely represent members of the royal court or even Roman women imitating Cleopatra's popular hairstyle.

Paintings

In the House of Marcus Fabius Rufus at Pompeii, Italy, a mid-1st century BC Second Style wall painting of the goddess Venus holding a cupid near massive temple doors is most likely a depiction of Cleopatra as Venus Genetrix with her son Caesarion. The commission of the painting most likely coincides with the erection of the Temple of Venus Genetrix in the Forum of Caesar in September 46 BC, where Caesar had a gilded statue erected depicting Cleopatra. This statue likely formed the basis of her depictions in both sculpted art as well as this painting at Pompeii. The woman in the painting wears a royal diadem over her head and is strikingly similar in appearance to the Vatican Cleopatra, which bears possible marks on the marble of its left cheek where a cupid's arm may have been torn off. The room with the painting was walled off by its owner, perhaps in reaction to the execution of Caesarion in 30 BC by order of Octavian, when public depictions of Cleopatra's son would have been unfavorable with the new Roman regime. Behind her golden diadem, crowned with a red jewel, is a translucent veil with crinkles that suggest the "melon" hairstyle favored by the queen. Her ivory-white skin, round face, long aquiline nose, and large round eyes were features common in both Roman and Ptolemaic depictions of deities. Roller affirms that "there seems little doubt that this is a depiction of Cleopatra and Caesarion before the doors of the Temple of Venus in the Forum Julium and, as such, it becomes the only extant contemporary painting of the queen."

Another painting from Pompeii, dated to the early 1st century AD and located in the House of Giuseppe II, contains a possible depiction of Cleopatra with her son Caesarion, both wearing royal diadems while she reclines and consumes poison in an act of suicide. The painting was originally thought to depict the Carthaginian noblewoman Sophonisba, who toward the end of the Second Punic War (218–201 BC) drank poison and committed suicide at the behest of her lover Masinissa, King of Numidia. Arguments in favor of it depicting Cleopatra include the strong connection of her house with that of the Numidian royal family, Masinissa and Ptolemy VIII Physcon having been associates, and Cleopatra's own daughter marrying the Numidian prince Juba II. Sophonisba was also a more obscure figure when the painting was made, while Cleopatra's suicide was far more famous. An asp is absent from the painting, but many Romans held the view that she received poison in another manner than a venomous snakebite. A set of double doors on the rear wall of the painting, positioned very high above the people in it, suggests the described layout of Cleopatra's tomb in Alexandria. A male servant holds the mouth of an artificial Egyptian crocodile (possibly an elaborate tray handle), while another man standing by is dressed as a Roman.

In 1818 a now lost encaustic painting was discovered in the Temple of Serapis at Hadrian's Villa, near Tivoli, Lazio, Italy, that depicted Cleopatra committing suicide with an asp biting her bare chest. A chemical analysis performed in 1822 confirmed that the medium for the painting was composed of one-third wax and two-thirds resin. The thickness of the painting over Cleopatra's bare flesh and her drapery were reportedly similar to the paintings of the Fayum mummy portraits. A steel engraving published by John Sartain in 1885 depicting the painting as described in the archaeological report shows Cleopatra wearing authentic clothing and jewelry of Egypt in the late Hellenistic period, as well as the radiant crown of the Ptolemaic rulers, as seen in their portraits on various coins minted during their respective reigns. After Cleopatra's suicide, Octavian commissioned a painting to be made depicting her being bitten by a snake, parading this image in her stead during his triumphal procession in Rome. The portrait painting of Cleopatra's death was perhaps among the great number of artworks and treasures taken from Rome by Emperor Hadrian to decorate his private villa, where it was found in an Egyptian temple.

A Roman panel painting from Herculaneum, Italy, dated to the 1st century AD possibly depicts Cleopatra. In it she wears a royal diadem, red or reddish-brown hair pulled back into a bun, pearl-studded hairpins, and earrings with ball-shaped pendants, the white skin of her face and neck set against a stark black background. Her hair and facial features are similar to those in the sculpted Berlin and Vatican portraits as well as her coinage. A highly similar painted bust of a woman with a blue headband in the House of the Orchard at Pompeii features Egyptian-style imagery, such as a Greek-style sphinx, and may have been created by the same artist.

Portland Vase

The Portland Vase, a Roman cameo glass vase dated to the Augustan period and now in the British Museum, includes a possible depiction of Cleopatra with Antony. In this interpretation, Cleopatra can be seen grasping Antony and drawing him toward her while a serpent (i.e. the asp) rises between her legs, Eros floats above, and Anton, the alleged ancestor of the Antonian family, looks on in despair as his descendant Antony is led to his doom. The other side of the vase perhaps contains a scene of Octavia, abandoned by her husband Antony but watched over by her brother, the emperor Augustus. The vase would thus have been created no earlier than 35 BC, when Antony sent his wife Octavia back to Italy and stayed with Cleopatra in Alexandria.

Native Egyptian art

The Bust of Cleopatra in the Royal Ontario Museum represents a bust of Cleopatra in the Egyptian style. Dated to the mid-1st century BC, it is perhaps the earliest depiction of Cleopatra as both a goddess and ruling pharaoh of Egypt. The sculpture also has pronounced eyes that share similarities with Roman copies of Ptolemaic sculpted works of art. The Dendera Temple complex, near Dendera, Egypt, contains Egyptian-style carved relief images along the exterior walls of the Temple of Hathor depicting Cleopatra and her young son Caesarion as a grown adult and ruling pharaoh making offerings to the gods. Augustus had his name inscribed there following the death of Cleopatra.

The woman in the basalt statue also holds a divided, double cornucopia (dikeras), which can be seen on coins of both Arsinoe II and Cleopatra. In his  (2006),  contends that this basalt statue, like other idealized Egyptian portraits of the queen, does not contain realistic facial features and hence adds little to the knowledge of her appearance. Adrian Goldsworthy writes that, despite these representations in the traditional Egyptian style, Cleopatra would have dressed as a native only "perhaps for certain rites" and instead would usually dress as a Greek monarch, which would include the Greek headband seen in her Greco-Roman busts.

Medieval and Early Modern reception

In modern times Cleopatra has become an icon of popular culture, a reputation shaped by theatrical representations dating back to the Renaissance as well as paintings and films. This material largely surpasses the scope and size of existent historiographic literature about her from classical antiquity and has made a greater impact on the general public's view of Cleopatra than the latter. The 14th-century English poet Geoffrey Chaucer, in The Legend of Good Women, contextualized Cleopatra for the Christian world of the Middle Ages. His depiction of Cleopatra and Antony, her shining knight engaged in courtly love, has been interpreted in modern times as being either playful or misogynistic satire. The Renaissance humanist , in his 1504 Libretto apologetico delle donne, was the first Italian to defend the reputation of Cleopatra and criticize the perceived moralizing and misogyny in Boccaccio's works. Works of Islamic historiography written in Arabic covered the reign of Cleopatra, such as the 10th-century Meadows of Gold by Al-Masudi, although his work erroneously claimed that Octavian died soon after Cleopatra's suicide.

Cleopatra appeared in miniatures for illuminated manuscripts, such as a depiction of her and Antony lying in a Gothic-style tomb by the Boucicaut Master in 1409. In the visual arts, the sculpted depiction of Cleopatra as a free-standing nude figure committing suicide began with the 16th-century sculptors Bartolommeo Bandinelli and Alessandro Vittoria. Early prints depicting Cleopatra include designs by the Renaissance artists Raphael and Michelangelo, as well as 15th-century woodcuts in illustrated editions of Boccaccio's works.

In the performing arts, the death of Elizabeth I of England in 1603, and the German publication in 1606 of alleged letters of Cleopatra, inspired Samuel Daniel to alter and republish his 1594 play Cleopatra in 1607. He was followed by William Shakespeare, whose Antony and Cleopatra, largely based on Plutarch, was first performed in 1608 and provided a somewhat salacious view of Cleopatra in stark contrast to England's own Virgin Queen. Cleopatra was also featured in operas, such as George Frideric Handel's 1724 Giulio Cesare in Egitto, which portrayed the love affair of Caesar and Cleopatra; Domenico Cimarosa wrote Cleopatra on a similar subject in 1789.

Modern depictions and brand imaging

In Victorian Britain, Cleopatra was highly associated with many aspects of ancient Egyptian culture and her image was used to market various household products, including oil lamps, lithographs, postcards and cigarettes. Fictional novels such as H. Rider Haggard's Cleopatra (1889) and Théophile Gautier's One of Cleopatra's Nights (1838) depicted the queen as a sensual and mystic Easterner, while the Egyptologist Georg Ebers's Cleopatra (1894) was more grounded in historical accuracy. The French dramatist Victorien Sardou and Irish playwright George Bernard Shaw produced plays about Cleopatra, while burlesque shows such as F. C. Burnand's Antony and Cleopatra offered satirical depictions of the queen connecting her and the environment she lived in with the modern age. Shakespeare's Antony and Cleopatra was considered canonical by the Victorian era. Its popularity led to the perception that the 1885 painting by Lawrence Alma-Tadema depicted the meeting of Antony and Cleopatra on her pleasure barge in Tarsus, although Alma-Tadema revealed in a private letter that it depicts a subsequent meeting of theirs in Alexandria. Also based on Shakespeare's play was Samuel Barber's opera Antony and Cleopatra (1966), commissioned for the opening of the Metropolitan Opera House. In his unfinished 1825 short story The Egyptian Nights, Alexander Pushkin popularized the claims of the 4th-century Roman historian Aurelius Victor, previously largely ignored, that Cleopatra had prostituted herself to men who paid for sex with their lives. Cleopatra also became appreciated outside the Western world and Middle East, as the Qing-dynasty Chinese scholar Yan Fu wrote an extensive biography of her.

Georges Méliès's Robbing Cleopatra's Tomb, an 1899 French silent horror film, was the first film to depict the character of Cleopatra. Hollywood films of the 20th century were influenced by earlier Victorian media, which helped to shape the character of Cleopatra played by Theda Bara in Cleopatra (1917), Claudette Colbert in Cleopatra (1934), and Elizabeth Taylor in Cleopatra (1963). In addition to her portrayal as a "vampire" queen, Bara's Cleopatra also incorporated tropes familiar from 19th-century Orientalist painting, such as despotic behavior, mixed with dangerous and overt female sexuality. Colbert's character of Cleopatra served as a glamour model for selling Egyptian-themed products in department stores in the 1930s, targeting female moviegoers. In preparation for the film starring Taylor as Cleopatra, women's magazines of the early 1960s advertised how to use makeup, clothes, jewelry, and hairstyles to achieve the "Egyptian" look similar to the queens Cleopatra and Nefertiti. By the end of the 20th century there were forty-three films, two hundred plays and novels, forty-five operas, and five ballets associated with Cleopatra.

Written works

Whereas myths about Cleopatra persist in popular media, important aspects of her career go largely unnoticed, such as her command of naval forces and administrative acts. Publications on ancient Greek medicine attributed to her are, however, likely to be the work of a physician by the same name writing in the late first century AD. Ingrid D. Rowland, who highlights that the "Berenice called Cleopatra" cited by the 3rd- or 4th-century female Roman physician Metrodora was likely conflated by medieval scholars as referring to Cleopatra. Only fragments exist of these medical and cosmetic writings, such as those preserved by Galen, including remedies for hair disease, baldness, and dandruff, along with a list of weights and measures for pharmacological purposes. Aëtius of Amida attributed a recipe for perfumed soap to Cleopatra, while Paul of Aegina preserved alleged instructions of hers for dyeing and curling hair.

Ancestry

Cleopatra belonged to the Macedonian Greek dynasty of the Ptolemies, their European origins tracing back to northern Greece. Through her father, Ptolemy XII Auletes, she was a descendant of two prominent companions of Alexander the Great of Macedon: the general Ptolemy I Soter, founder of the Ptolemaic Kingdom of Egypt, and Seleucus I Nicator, the Macedonian Greek founder of the Seleucid Empire of West Asia. While Cleopatra's paternal line can be traced, the identity of her mother is unknown. She was presumably the daughter of Cleopatra VI Tryphaena (also known as Cleopatra V Tryphaena), the sister-wife of Ptolemy XII who had previously given birth to their daughter Berenice IV.

Cleopatra I Syra was the only member of the Ptolemaic dynasty known for certain to have introduced some non-Greek ancestry. Her mother Laodice III was a daughter born to King Mithridates II of Pontus, a Persian of the Mithridatic dynasty, and his wife Laodice who had a mixed Greek-Persian heritage. Cleopatra I Syra's father Antiochus III the Great was a descendant of Queen Apama, the Sogdian Iranian wife of Seleucus I Nicator. It is generally believed that the Ptolemies did not intermarry with native Egyptians. Michael Grant asserts that there is only one known Egyptian mistress of a Ptolemy and no known Egyptian wife of a Ptolemy, further arguing that Cleopatra probably did not have any Egyptian ancestry and "would have described herself as Greek." Stacy Schiff writes that Cleopatra was a Macedonian Greek with some Persian ancestry, arguing that it was rare for the Ptolemies to have an Egyptian mistress. Duane W. Roller speculates that Cleopatra could have been the daughter of a theoretical half-Macedonian-Greek, half-Egyptian woman from Memphis in northern Egypt belonging to a family of priests dedicated to Ptah (a hypothesis not generally accepted in scholarship), but contends that whatever Cleopatra's ancestry, she valued her Greek Ptolemaic heritage the most. Ernle Bradford writes that Cleopatra challenged Rome not as an Egyptian woman "but as a civilized Greek."

Claims that Cleopatra was an illegitimate child never appeared in Roman propaganda against her. Strabo was the only ancient historian who claimed that Ptolemy XII's children born after Berenice IV, including Cleopatra, were illegitimate. Cleopatra V (or VI) was expelled from the court of Ptolemy XII in late 69 BC, a few months after the birth of Cleopatra, while Ptolemy XII's three younger children were all born during the absence of his wife. The high degree of inbreeding among the Ptolemies is also illustrated by Cleopatra's immediate ancestry, of which a reconstruction is shown below. The family tree given below also lists Cleopatra V, Ptolemy XII's wife, as a daughter of Ptolemy X Alexander I and Berenice III, which would make her a cousin of her husband, Ptolemy XII, but she could have been a daughter of Ptolemy IX Lathyros, which would have made her a sister-wife of Ptolemy XII instead. The confused accounts in ancient primary sources have also led scholars to number Ptolemy XII's wife as either Cleopatra V or Cleopatra VI; the latter may have actually been a daughter of Ptolemy XII, and some use her as an indication that Cleopatra V had died in 69 BC rather than reappearing as a co-ruler with Berenice IV in 58 BC (during Ptolemy XII's exile in Rome).

See also
 List of female hereditary rulers

Notes

References

Sources

Online

Print

 
 
 
 
 
  
 
 
 
 
 
 
 
 
 
 
 
 
 
 
 
 
 
 .

Further reading

External links

 Ancient Roman depictions of Cleopatra VII of Egypt, at YouTube
 
 Cleopatra (1852), a Victorian children's book by Jacob Abbott, Project Gutenberg edition
 "Mysterious Death of Cleopatra" at the Discovery Channel
 Cleopatra VII at BBC History
 Cleopatra VII at World History Encyclopedia
 Eubanks, W. Ralph. (1 November 2010). "How History and Hollywood Got 'Cleopatra' Wrong". National Public Radio (NPR) (a book review of Cleopatra: A Life, by Stacy Schiff).
 Jarus, Owen (13 March 2014). "Cleopatra: Facts & Biography". Live Science.
 Watkins, Thayer. "The Timeline of the Life of Cleopatra ." San Jose State University.
 Draycott, Jane (22 May 2018). "Cleopatra's Daughter: While Antony and Cleopatra have been immortalised in history and in popular culture, their offspring have been all but forgotten. Their daughter, Cleopatra Selene, became an important ruler in her own right". History Today.

 
69 BC births
30 BC deaths
1st-century BC Pharaohs
1st-century BC Egyptian people
1st-century BC women rulers
Deaths due to snake bites
Egyptian queens regnant
Female pharaohs
Female Shakespearean characters
Hellenistic-era people
Mistresses of Julius Caesar
Pharaohs of the Ptolemaic dynasty
Ancient people who committed suicide
1st-century BC women writers
Hellenistic Cyprus
Wives of Mark Antony